Rao Bahadur Shripad Subrao Talmaki (25 December 1868 - 28 January 1948) was a social reformer and early pioneer of the Cooperative movement in India and is known as the father of India's cooperative movement.
He was a member of the Chitrapur Saraswat community.

He was the main architect for the founding of The Shamrao Vithal Co-operative Bank Ltd (now known as SVC Cooperative Bank Limited), which was registered on 27 December 1906,  and he named it after Late Shamrao Vithal Kaikini, who was his main guiding force and Guru. It was set up with the primary objective of assisting the less fortunate members of the community in its economic enterprises, to encourage savings and to create funds for providing financial aid to deserving members.

On 28 March 1915, he co-founded the Saraswat Cooperative Housing Society in Gamdevi, Bombay (Mumbai), Asia's first Cooperative Housing Society.

References

People from Uttara Kannada
Indian social reformers
1868 births
1948 deaths